Khalid Salman Al-Muhannadi (born 5 April 1962) is a Qatari former footballer, playing and scoring in World Youth Championships, various Gulf Cups and the 1984 Summer Olympics. He was part of a golden generation of Qatari footballers in the eighties and nineties along with Mansoor Muftah, Ibrahim Khalfan, Mahmoud Soufi, Adel Khamis and many more. His most memorable matches include those against Brazil in the World Youth Championship (he scored a hat-trick) and against France at the 1984 Olympics. He retired from football in September 1998, playing his retirement match against Sudan under national team coach Luiz Gonzaga. The match ended 1–1.

Career

Club career
He played for Al-Sadd at club level. His free-kick goal in the Asian Club Championship 1988-89 final gave Al-Sadd their first Asian title.

International career
Salman represented the Qatar olympic team at the 1984 Summer Olympics, and scored a brace against France, which account for the only two goals Qatar scored during the tournament. He also played for the Qatar national football team at the 1988 AFC Asian Cup finals, scoring a goal in the group stage.

International goals

Television
Salman works as an analyst for various Gulf sports channels, especially Al-Kass, where he appears in the Al Majlis talk show.

Ambassador for 2022 FIFA World Cup
Salman was selected as one of the local ambassadors for 2022 FIFA World Cup and its legacy programmes.

Comments on homosexuality 
During an interview with German television channel ZDF on 8 November 2022, Salman made comments about homosexuality, saying "during the World Cup, many things would come into the country. For example, let's talk about gays. The most important thing would be that everyone would accept that they come here. But they would have to accept our rules." Salman mentioned that he has problems with children seeing gay men. He argued that children would then learn something that would be not good. He said that being gay is "haram" or forbidden, and described homosexuality as a "damage in the mind". The interview was stopped by a World Cup organizing committee press officer. His comments led to massive criticism in Germany. However, Salman later stated that his comments were misinterpreted and that "damage in the mind" was in relation to alcohol and not homosexuality.

References

External links
 
 
 Khalid Salman – History – Al Sadd Club 

1962 births
Living people
Qatari footballers
Qatar international footballers
1984 AFC Asian Cup players
1988 AFC Asian Cup players
Footballers at the 1984 Summer Olympics
Olympic footballers of Qatar
Al Sadd SC players
Qatar Stars League players
Association football midfielders
Sports controversies